Parliamentary elections were held in Iraq on 20 June 1980, the first since 1958. The elections were contested by around 860 candidates  and saw the Ba'ath Party win 187 of the 250 seats. Voter turnout was approximately 80%.

Results

References

Elections in Iraq
Iraq
1980 elections in Iraq
June 1980 events in Asia
Election and referendum articles with incomplete results